Leptopsilopa is a genus of shore flies in the family Ephydridae.

Species

L. africana Cresson, 1946
L. andiana Mathis, 2006
L. atrimana (Loew, 1878)
L. aurata (Canzoneri & Meneghini, 1969)
L. demartini Canzoneri, 1987
L. flavicoxa Mathis, 2006
L. leonensis Canzoneri & Rampini, 1990
L. lineanota Cresson, 1922
L. martharum Mathis, 2006
L. metallina (Becker, 1919)
L. mianii Canzoneri & Raffone, 1987
L. mutabilis Cresson, 1925
L. nigricoxa Cresson, 1922
L. nigrimanus (Williston, 1896)
L. placentia Mathis, 2006
L. pollinosa (Kertész, 1901)
L. rossii Canzoneri & Raffone, 1987
L. similis (Coquillett, 1900)
L. subapicalis Cresson, 1922
L. tibialis (Canzoneri & Meneghini, 1969)
L. varipes (Coquillett, 1900)

References

Ephydridae
Taxa named by Ezra Townsend Cresson
Diptera of North America
Diptera of Africa
Diptera of Australasia
Brachycera genera